David Eddy may refer to:

 David Eddy (badminton), British retired badminton player 
 David Eddy (ice hockey) (born 1990), Canadian ice hockey player
 David M. Eddy (born 1941), American medical doctor